Ordo salutis (Latin: "order of salvation") refers to a series of conceptual steps within the Christian doctrine of salvation.

Definition
Ordo salutis has been defined as, "a technical term of Protestant dogmatics to designate the consecutive steps in the work of the Holy Spirit in the appropriation of salvation." Although there is within Christian theology a certain sense in which the phases of salvation are sequential, some elements are understood to occur progressively and others instantaneously. Furthermore, some steps within the "order of salvation" are regarded as objective (or monergistic), performed solely by God, while others are considered subjective (or synergistic), involving humanity.  Christians prior to the Protestant Reformation, while not using the exact phrase, sought to order the elements of salvation. The term "Ordo salutis" was first used by Lutheran theologians in the mid-1720s.

Different schemes

Criticism and support 
Some recent theologians such as Karl Barth, G. Berkouwer and H. Ridderbos have criticised the idea of an "order of salvation." For example, Barth sees the ordo salutis as running the risk of "psychologizing" salvation and Berkouwer is concerned the ordering does not do justice to the "fullness" of salvation. Another criticism comes from Richard Gaffin who asserts "that union with Christ is for Paul the overarching factor within which the various elements of the order of Salvation are to be considered."

However, those wishing to sustain an idea of sequential order in salvation appeal to Romans 8:29-30 (KJV);

The concept of an ordered sequence of soteriological doctrines was also an important part of the construction of the Westminster Confession. In addition, Hendrikus Berkhof observes that Christians cannot avoid thinking "coherently" about the particular elements of salvation.

References

External links 
Ordo Salutis in Major Denominations - Reformed Answers

Christian terminology
Latin religious words and phrases
Salvation in Protestantism
Arminianism
Lutheran theology
Calvinist theology
Catholic theology and doctrine